The 1972 Miller High Life 500 was a NASCAR Winston Cup Series racing event that took place on March 5, 1972, at Ontario Motor Speedway in Ontario, California.

Race report

Two hundred laps took place on a paved track spanning ; the race was resolved in three hours and fifty-six minutes. With a purse larger than the previous month's Daytona 500, 113 cars were waiting in line to compete in three qualifying sessions to fill the 51-car grid. An unprecedented number of teams failed to qualify for the race. 

Given the economic outlook of that era, it was amazing that 113 cars would try to earn a spot on the racing grid (with only a 45% chance of actually qualifying for the race). Clem Proctor won the 100-lap Sportsman race that was held the day before this race in a 1963 Thunderbird. The 1971 winner George Follmer withdrew after his owner had a dispute with the way NASCAR was inspecting the cars, seems like only two cars (Follmer's and Sonny Easley's) were being checked with templates as both were 1968 models and everything else was older. This would be the first of five consecutive races where the pole winner won the race, only time in NASCAR this has happened. 

A. J. Foyt defeated Bobby Allison by 4.2 seconds in front of nearly 69,000 live spectators. This victory would be as equally impressive as his wins at the 1964 Firecracker 400 and the 1972 Daytona 500. Jim Vandiver would earn the last-place finish due to an engine issue on the very first lap of the race. Country music legend Marty Robbins would compete in this race in a 1972 Dodge Charger vehicle; he started in 22nd and ended in 8th place. After the race, Robbins was named as the "Sportsman of the Race." The winner's purse for the 1972 Miller High Life 500 was $31,695 ($ when adjusted for inflation). 

Drivers that made what would be their final start in NASCAR's top series were: Cliff Garner, Ron Gautsche, Les Loeser, and Don White. The drivers who commenced their NASCAR Cup Series careers during this race were: Carl Adams, Bill Butts, former USAC Championship Car series driver George Follmer, and Jim Whitt. Follmer would eventually go back to USAC Championship Car racing for its 1974 season.

Notable crew chiefs who actively participated in the race were Richard Elder, Junie Donvaley, Harry Hyde, Dale Inman, and Tom Vandiver.

Qualifying

Failed to qualify: Pat Fay (#99), Bill Shirey (#74), Perry Cottingham (#73), Dale Lee (#65), Tru Cheek (#62), Don Graham (#57W), Ken Shoemaker (#56), Jerry Barnett (#55), John Fairchild (#50), Sam Stanley (#47W), Bill Seifert (#45), D.K. Ulrich (#40), George Wiltshire (#39), Jimmy Insolo (#38), Joe Frasson (#78), Marion Collins (#78W), Dick May (#84), Richard Childress (#96), Harry Jefferson (#94), Larry Smith (#92), Verlin Eaker (#91), Richard D. Brown (#91), Bill Dennis (#90), Clint Hutchins (#89W), Les Covey (#89), Mike Saint (#88W), Ron Keselowski (#88), Allen Jennings (#86), Dan Geiger (#85), Harry Schilling (#84W), Don Tarr (#37), Frank Burnett (#36), Ed Negre (#8), Bob England (#8W), Steve Pfeifer (#08), Ivan Baldwin (#07), Charlie Glotzbach (#6), Jerry Oliver (#6W), Neil Castles (#06), Doc Faustina (#5), John Sears (#4), Emiliano Zapata (#04), Tommy Gale (#03), Johnny Steele (#2), Frank James (#00W), John Lyons (#9), Phillip Pedlar (#11W), Larry Esau (#12W), Bub Strickler (#35), Gene Riniker (#34W), Wendell Scott (#34), Glenn Francis (#33), Johnny Halford (#32), Carl Joiner (#26), Chuck Hetrick (#25W), Jabe Thomas (#25), Jim Gilliam (#24W), Nels Miller (#21W), Paul Dorrity (#15), Arnie Krueger (#14W), Willie McNeal (#14), Bobby Mausgrover (#00)

Finishing order
Section reference: 

 A.J. Foyt
 Bobby Allison
 Buddy Baker
 Richard Petty
 Ray Elder
 Hershel McGriff
 James Hylton
 Marty Robbins
 Elmo Langley
 Ramo Stott
 Jimmy Finger
 Jack McCoy
 John Soares, Jr.
 Benny Parsons
 Bill Butts
 Cliff Garner
 Johnny Anderson
 Dick Bown
 Jim Danielson
 Bill Champion
 Ben Arnold
 Kevin Terris
 J.D. McDuffie
 Mike James
 Dean Dalton
 Raymond Williams
 Jim Whitt
 George Altheide
 Bob Kauf
 Carl Adams
 Henley Gray
 Charlie Roberts
 Chuck Bown
 Les Loeser, Jr.
 Ron Gautsche
 Cecil Gordon
 Dick Kranzler
 Don White
 Gene Romero
 G.T. Tallas
 Red Farmer
 Earle Canavan
 Frank Warren
 Mark Donohue
 Bobby Isaac
 Bill Osborne
 Walter Ballard
 Don Noel
 George Follmer
 David Ray Boggs
 Jim Vandiver

Timeline
Section reference: 
 Start: A.J. Foyt had the pole position as the green flag was waved in the air.
 Lap 6: George Follmer blew his vehicle's engine; starting a caution which ended on lap 16.
 Lap 37: Walter Ballard had a terminal crash on turn three; caution ended on lap 41.
 Lap 47: Mark Donohue and Bobby Isaac had an accident on turn one; caution ended on lap 55.
 Lap 150: Cecil Gordon had a terminal crash on turn four; caution ended on lap 155.
 Finish: A.J. Foyt was officially declared the winner of the event.

References

Miller High Life 500
Miller High Life 500
NASCAR races at Ontario Motor Speedway